Xalapa Cathedral or in full, Catedral Metropolitana de la Inmaculada Concepción de Xalapa is a Roman Catholic cathedral in the city of Xalapa, Veracruz, in eastern Mexico. The see of the Metropolitan Archdiocese of Xalapa, it is one of the oldest constructions of the city.

The cathedral was originally built in 1641, but in 1772 it underwent massive change that reconstructed it in the baroque style. Some details in some parts of cathedral remain from this, including the bell tower. The clock itself was imported from England. The consecration of the status of cathedral was announced in 1864, coinciding with the creation of the Metropolitan Archdiocese of Xalapa to support it. In 1896, it underwent further modification forming an appearance, much of which remains today.

External links 

Information about Xalapa Cathedral

Xalapa
Roman Catholic cathedrals in Mexico
Buildings and structures in Veracruz
Tourist attractions in Veracruz
1640s establishments in New Spain
1770s establishments in Mexico
Spanish Colonial architecture in Mexico
Gothic Revival church buildings in Mexico
Baroque church buildings in Mexico
Roman Catholic churches completed in 1641
Roman Catholic churches completed in 1772
17th-century Roman Catholic church buildings in Mexico
18th-century Roman Catholic church buildings in Mexico